This is a list of fellows of the Royal Society elected in 1906.

Fellows
Sir George Thomas Beilby  (1850–1924)
Charles William Andrews  (1866–1924)
Edward Cecil Guinness 1st Earl of Iveagh (1847–1927)
Richard Burdon Haldane Viscount Haldane of Cloan (1856–1928)
Walter Heape  (1855–1929)
Thomas John I'Anson Bromwich  (1875–1929)
Archibald Byron Macallum  (1858–1934)
James Ernest Marsh  (1860–1938)
Arthur William Patrick Albert Duke of Connaught and Strathearn (1850–1942)
Sir Henry George Lyons  (1864–1944)
Sir Peter Chalmers Mitchell  (1864–1945)
Sir James Hopwood Jeans  (1877–1946)
Sir Almroth Edward Wright  (1861–1947)
Frederick Frost Blackman  (1866–1947)
Philip Herbert Cowell  (1870–1949)
Charles Herbert Lees  (1864–1952)
Sir James Swinburne  (1858–1958)
Harold Albert Wilson  (1874–1964)

References

1906
1906 in the United Kingdom
1906 in science